Charles Theodore Halswell Kemeys-Tynte, 8th Baron Wharton JP (18 September 1876 – 4 March 1934) was a British aristocrat and Justice of the Peace. He was the son of Halswell Milborne Kemeys-Tynte.

He served as a JP of Monmouth & Somerset, he was also an honorary Lieutenant in the Army 1915–1918. He had also served as a Lieutenant of the Royal Monmouthshire Royal Engineers. The abeyance of the Barony of Wharton was terminated in his favour by Writ of Summons to Parliament 15 February 1916. In 1899 he married Dorothy Ellis and had issue John Kemeys-Tynte, 9th Baron Wharton and Elisabeth Kemeys-Tynte, 10th Baroness Wharton.

References 
 Burke's Peerage & Baronetage 107th edition.

1876 births
1934 deaths
Barons Wharton